News Bunny was station mascot of the short-lived UK TV Station L!VE TV, under its publicity-seeking boss Kelvin MacKenzie.

Role 

During news bulletins an extra dressed as a giant rabbit would stand behind the news presenter, and mime actions related to the news. For example, good news would be greeted with an enthusiastic thumbs up, while during bad news the bunny would hang his head and look sad.

Up until this point almost all UK TV news was presented in a serious manner; the News Bunny helped pave the way for subsequent more relaxed approaches to news presentation, as demonstrated on Channel 5 and The Big Breakfast. The impact of News Bunny has been the subject of academic research. The Bunny was intended to appeal to the station's target audience of young people, particularly young men, and was part of McKenzie's populist stable of programmes (see L!VE TV entry for details).

History 

News Bunny first appeared in January 1996, and was played by various people, usually the station's news producers and researchers. Depending on who was available at the time, various other L!VE TV staff were also called upon to don the famous suit in "one off" appearances, including Richard Bacon, later to become a BBC TV "Blue Peter" presenter, and Nick Ferrari, a previous editor of The Sun's "Bizarre" column.  This was documented in the book "L!VE TV - Tellybrats and Topless Darts".

Despite the channel's poor ratings News Bunny became a national cult figure, attracting much tabloid and other media interest, and being mentioned in Parliament.
Aside from his studio appearances, News Bunny regularly appeared alongside politicians, pop stars and royalty, many of whom would have preferred to avoid him. These appearances usually occurred during outside broadcasts and publicity stunts. The Bunny gate-crashed an official visit by Michael Heseltine to Canary Wharf in 1996, and famously secured 8 seconds with Tony Blair.

News Bunny also appeared in the 1997 BBC comedy drama Gobble, a satire on recent food poisoning crises, written by Ian Hislop. During the course of the drama, News Bunny performed Nazi salutes at a mention of the German agricultural minister and was ultimately punched by the protagonist.

News Bunny also stood for Parliament representing the "L!VE TV Party" in the 1996 South East Staffordshire by-election, polling 85 votes. In order to do this, Mirror Group employee Ashley Hames had to change his name to "News Bunny" for the purposes of the election. According to an apocryphal story circulating among journalists at the time, during the campaign a stunt went wrong and the hapless hack was arrested for obstruction. As there was a police case pending against him, he was unable to change his name back for some time and had to live as "Mr N. Bunny" for weeks longer than he had expected. According to Hames, Kelvin McKenzie proclaimed the arrest of News Bunny on camera as, "the best (expletive removed) piece of television I've ever seen in my life!"

News Bunny went off air with L!VE TV in 1999 and is now owned by Vauxhall-based ETV, founded by L!VE's former management team. The character made a brief revival during their 2003 relaunch of the station on Sky Digital.

Performers 

The main performers of News Bunny, in order of appearance were Ashley Hames, Ashley Revell, Scott Harman, Darren Lamb, Andy Clarke, and Nik Hodges as well as his stand-in Tim Rider and Emily Latham.

News Bunny as media industry epithet

News Bunny has since become a media term occasionally used to refer to a news presenter, usually female, who has been hired for her attractiveness or capacity to entertain, rather than as a serious reporter.

References

 Quentin Falk, Ben Falk, Television's Strangest Moments: Extraordinary But True Tales from the History of Television, Franz Steiner Verlag, 2005, p. 236
 Ashley Hames, Sin Cities, Tonto Books, 2008, p. 33

External links 

Ashley Hames (original News Bunny) 

News_Bunny
Mascots introduced in 1996
Television mascots
Rabbit and hare mascots
Rabbits and hares in popular culture